Martin Ručinský (born 11 March 1971) is a Czech former professional ice hockey player who played 16 seasons in the National Hockey League (NHL). Ručínský was drafted by the Edmonton Oilers in the first round as the 20th overall selection in the 1991 NHL Entry Draft on 22 June 1991.

Ručinský led the Montreal Canadiens in 1998–99 with 17 goals. It was the first time since the 1940–41 season, that the Canadiens did not have at least one twenty-goal scorer.  He was the last player for the Quebec Nordiques still active in professional hockey prior to his retirement in 2015.

Ručinský was inducted into the Czech Ice Hockey Hall of Fame on 22 January 2019.

Transactions
 22 June 1991 – Edmonton Oilers' first-round draft choice (20th overall - from the Los Angeles Kings) in the 1991 NHL Entry Draft.
 10 March 1992 – Traded by the Edmonton Oilers to the Quebec Nordiques in exchange for Ron Tugnutt and Brad Zavisha.
 21 June 1995 – Rights transferred to the Colorado Avalanche after Quebec relocated.
 6 December 1995 – Traded by the Colorado Avalanche, along with Andrei Kovalenko and Jocelyn Thibault, to the Montreal Canadiens in exchange for Patrick Roy and Mike Keane.
 21 November 2001 – Traded by the Montreal Canadiens, along with Benoît Brunet, to the Dallas Stars in exchange for Donald Audette and Shaun Van Allen.
 12 March 2002 – Traded by the Dallas Stars, along with Roman Lyashenko to the New York Rangers in exchange for Manny Malhotra and Barrett Heisten.
 30 October 2002 – Signed as a free agent with the St. Louis Blues.
 28 August 2003 – Signed as a free agent with the New York Rangers.
 9 March 2004 – Traded by the New York Rangers to the Vancouver Canucks in exchange for R. J. Umberger and Martin Grenier.
 3 August 2005 – Signed as a free agent with the New York Rangers.
 2 August 2006 – Signed as a free agent with the St. Louis Blues.
 23 July 2008 - Signed as a free agent with Sparta Prague of the Czech Extraliga.
 16 July 2015 - Announced his retirement from professional hockey.

Career statistics

Regular season and playoffs

International

References

External links

1971 births
Living people
Cape Breton Oilers players
Colorado Avalanche players
Czech ice hockey left wingers
Dallas Stars players
Edmonton Oilers draft picks
Edmonton Oilers players
Halifax Citadels players
HC Litvínov players
HC Sparta Praha players
Ice hockey players at the 1998 Winter Olympics
Ice hockey players at the 2002 Winter Olympics
Ice hockey players at the 2006 Winter Olympics
Medalists at the 1998 Winter Olympics
Medalists at the 2006 Winter Olympics
Montreal Canadiens players
National Hockey League All-Stars
National Hockey League first-round draft picks
New York Rangers players
Olympic bronze medalists for the Czech Republic
Olympic gold medalists for the Czech Republic
Olympic ice hockey players of the Czech Republic
Olympic medalists in ice hockey
Sportspeople from Most (city)
Quebec Nordiques players
St. Louis Blues players
Vancouver Canucks players
VHK Vsetín players
Czechoslovak expatriate sportspeople in Canada
Czechoslovak ice hockey left wingers
Czech expatriate ice hockey players in the United States
Czech expatriate ice hockey players in Canada
Czechoslovak expatriate ice hockey people